Computaris is a UK-based company owned by R Systems group that provides software development, system integration and technical consultancy services. Computaris operates from branch offices in Poland, Romania, Moldova, USA, Malaysia, Philippines, and India.

Computaris is active in areas such as convergent billing, messaging, SDP, VAS, provisioning, mediation, rating and charging, service management, mobile commerce, mobile payment systems, IN (SCP and IN Protocols), Next generation services, policy management, Business Intelligence and integration with GSM network elements (MSC, HLR, VLR, GGSN etc.).

On 27 January 2011, R Systems International Ltd. announced that it had acquired Computaris International Limited.

Offices and development centres 
R Systems Computaris has its European headquarters in Romania with offices and development centres in Romania (Bucharest and Galati), Poland (Warsaw and Bialystok), Moldova (Chisinau), UK, and Switzerland.

External links
R Systems Computaris website

References

Wall-Street article
Convergence helps MVNOs to meet new challenges
Billing World article
PR announcing 2010 FY results

BT Group
Television in the United Kingdom
Mass media companies of the United Kingdom
Video on demand services